The Odd Couple is a 1968 American comedy film directed by Gene Saks, produced by Howard W. Koch and written by Neil Simon, based on his 1965 play. It stars Jack Lemmon and Walter Matthau as two divorced men, neurotic neat-freak Felix Ungar and fun-loving slob Oscar Madison, who decide to live together.

The film was successful with critics and grossed over $44.5 million, making it the third highest-grossing film of 1968 in the United States. The success of the film was the basis for the ABC television sitcom of the same name, starring Tony Randall and Jack Klugman as Felix and Oscar.

A sequel, The Odd Couple II, was released in 1998, almost three decades later, in which Lemmon and Matthau reprised their roles. However, it was a critical and commercial failure.

Plot 
Newly separated Felix Ungar wanders New York City in a daze with vague ideas of committing suicide.

Divorced sports writer Oscar Madison and his card-playing cronies Murray, Speed, Roy and  Vinnie have assembled in Madison's Washington Heights apartment for their Friday night poker game. Murray is concerned because their mutual friend Felix Ungar is unusually late for the game. Murray's wife calls and informs them that Felix is missing. Oscar then calls Felix's wife Frances, who tells him that she and Felix have broken up. Felix arrives not knowing that everyone has already heard that he and his wife have separated. The group attempts to pretend nothing is wrong, but Felix eventually breaks down crying and his friends attempt to console him. After everyone leaves, Oscar suggests that Felix move in with him, since Oscar has lived alone since he split up with his own ex-wife, Blanche, some time earlier. Felix agrees and urges Oscar to not be shy about letting him know if he gets on Oscar's nerves.

Within only a week, the two men discover they are incompatible. Felix runs around the apartment cleaning, picking up after Oscar, and berating him for being so sloppy. Felix refuses to have any fun, spending most of his time thinking about Frances. While at a tavern, Oscar tells Felix about two English sisters he recently met who live in their building: Cecily and Gwendolyn Pigeon. Oscar telephones the girls and arranges a double date for the following evening.

The next night, Oscar tries to get uptight Felix to loosen up by leaving him alone with the two flirtatious sisters while he leaves the room to mix drinks. Instead, Felix talks incessantly about his family, breaks down weeping, and burns the meatloaf. Furious about Felix's ruining the date, Oscar resorts to giving Felix the silent treatment and torturing him by deliberately making the apartment as much of a mess as possible. Eventually, the tension explodes into an argument that results in Oscar demanding that Felix move out. Felix complies, but leaves Oscar feeling guilty for having abandoned his still-in-need friend.

Oscar assembles the poker group to help search the city for Felix. After searching for hours, they return to Oscar's apartment to play poker and soon discover that Felix has moved in with the Pigeon sisters with plans to get a place of his own. Felix and Oscar apologize to each other, realizing that a bit of each has rubbed off on the other, with each being a better person for it. Felix promises that next week he will attend their usual Friday night poker game. After Felix's final exit, the once slovenly Oscar tells his friends to watch their messes as the poker game continues.

Cast 

 Jack Lemmon as Felix Ungar
 Walter Matthau as Oscar Madison
 Herb Edelman as Murray
 John Fiedler as Vinnie
 David Sheiner as Roy
 Larry Haines as Speed
 Monica Evans as Cecily Pigeon
 Carole Shelley as Gwendolyn Pigeon
 Billie Bird as Chambermaid
 Iris Adrian as Waitress
 Angelique Pettyjohn as Go-Go dancer
 Ted Beniades as Bartender
 Bill Baldwin as Sports announcer

Production and casting
The Odd Couple was originally produced for Broadway and the original cast starred Art Carney as Felix and Walter Matthau as Oscar. For the film version, Matthau reprised his role as Oscar, and Felix was portrayed by Jack Lemmon. At one point, Frank Sinatra (as Felix) and Jackie Gleason (as Oscar) were reportedly considered for the film version. Dick Van Dyke and Tony Randall were also among those considered for the role of Felix (Randall later  portrayed Felix in the 1970 TV series). Similarly,  Mickey Rooney and Jack Klugman (who replaced Matthau on Broadway as Oscar and later played him in the 1970 TV series) were also considered to portray Oscar. Much of the original script from the play has been retained for the film, although the setting is expanded: instead of taking place entirely in Oscar's apartment, Simon also added some scenes that take place at various New York City locations (such as the scene at Shea Stadium in Queens, New York).

Oscar's poker playing cronies were Roy (David Sheiner), Vinnie (John Fiedler), Speed (Larry Haines) and Murray the Cop (Herbert Edelman). The film made its debut at Radio City Music Hall in 1968. It was a hit and earned Neil Simon a nomination for the Academy Award for Writing Adapted Screenplay. The film was also nominated for the Golden Globe Award for Best Motion Picture - Musical or Comedy and Lemmon and Matthau were both nominated for the Golden Globe Award for Best Actor - Motion Picture Musical or Comedy.

The scene at Shea Stadium, which also featured Heywood Hale Broun, was filmed right before a real game between the New York Mets and the Pittsburgh Pirates on June 27, 1967. Roberto Clemente was asked to hit into the triple play that Oscar misses, but he refused to do it and Bill Mazeroski took his place.

One of the outdoor scenes in the film involved Felix shopping at Bohack, a Maspeth, Queens-based supermarket chain ubiquitous in the New York City area during the mid-20th century. The last Bohack supermarket closed in 1977.

Theme music 
The award-winning jazz instrumental theme was composed by Neal Hefti. The theme was used throughout the movie's sequel, starring Lemmon and Matthau and released 30 years later, and also adapted for the 1970 TV series and used over the opening credits. The song also has seldom-heard lyrics, written by Sammy Cahn.

Release and reception 
The film's copyright date in the opening credits mistakenly reads MCMXLVII (1947).

The Odd Couple garnered both critical acclaim and box-office success; it opened at New York's Radio City Music Hall on May 2, 1968 and ran there for a record-breaking 14 weeks with a record gross of $3.1 million. It grossed over $44.5 million in the United States, making it the third highest-grossing film of 1968. The Odd Couple received universal acclaim from critics, earning a 98% "Fresh" rating on the review aggregate website Rotten Tomatoes based on 40 reviews, with a weighted average of 8/10.

Roger Ebert gave the film three-and-a-half stars out of four and praised the "universally good" performances, though he noted times when "the movie's Broadway origins are painfully evident, as when the players in the poker game are grouped around three sides of the table, but the 'downstage' side is always left bare." Renata Adler of The New York Times called the film "a very funny, professional adaptation" of the play although "Mr. Lemmon sometimes overacts." Arthur D. Murphy of Variety called it an "excellent film," adding, "Teaming of Lemmon and Matthau has provided each with an outstanding comedy partner." Charles Champlin of the Los Angeles Times declared, "My not very fearless forecast is that 'The Odd Couple' will cause more people to do more laughing than any film you are likely to see all year." Stanley Eichelbaum of the San Francisco Examiner wrote that "Neil Simon, whose hit plays haven't always been served too well by Hollywood (remember the flat-footed film of Barefoot in the Park), did his own adaptation this time and there's been no appreciable loss of hilarity", also applauding Saks' direction and the performances of the cast.

Awards and honors 

The film is recognized by American Film Institute in these lists:
 2000: AFI's 100 Years...100 Laughs – #17
 2005: AFI's 100 Years...100 Movie Quotes:
 Oscar Madison: "I cannot stand little notes on my pillow! “We are all out of cornflakes, F.U.” It took me three hours to figure out F.U. was Felix Ungar." – Nominated

TV series 
The film spawned a television series spin-off in 1970, also entitled The Odd Couple, which ran until 1975. As the series ended, a cartoon version called The Oddball Couple ran on ABC. Produced by Depatie-Freleng, it features a sloppy dog and a neat cat.

Sequel 
In 1998, almost three decades later, a sequel, The Odd Couple II, was released. It reunited Lemmon and Matthau, along with original writer Neil Simon. However, it was a critical and commercial failure, grossing less than half than its predecessor.

See also
 List of American films of 1968

References

External links 
 
 
 
 
 

Film
1968 films
1960s buddy comedy films
American buddy comedy films
American films based on plays
Films about obsessive–compulsive disorder
Films about suicide
Films adapted into television shows
Films based on works by Neil Simon
Films directed by Gene Saks
Films produced by Howard W. Koch
Films scored by Neal Hefti
Films set in New York City
Films shot in New York City
Films with screenplays by Neil Simon
Paramount Pictures films
1960s English-language films
1960s American films